The Romans in Britain is a 1980 stage play by Howard Brenton that comments upon imperialism and the abuse of power. It was the subject of a private prosecution brought by the conservative moral campaigner Mary Whitehouse for gross indecency.

A cast of thirty actors play sixty roles.

Stage history 
The play was first staged at the National Theatre in London on 16 October 1980. In 1982 it became the focus of an unsuccessful private prosecution by Christian morality campaigner Mary Whitehouse against the play's director Michael Bogdanov relating to the on-stage depiction of homosexual rape. This prosecution was defeated when Whitehouse's solicitor, Graham Ross-Cornes, the chief witness against Bogdanov, revealed under cross-examination that he had been sitting at the very back of the theatre when he saw what was claimed to be a penis. The prosecution withdrew after lead defence counsel Jeremy Hutchinson QC demonstrated that Ross-Cornes could have witnessed the actor's thumb protruding from his fist. The case was ended after the Attorney-General entered a nolle prosequi.

Actor-director Samuel West revived the play in 2006 at the Crucible Theatre, Sheffield, starring Tom Mannion as Julius Caesar and Dan Stevens as Marban the Druid.

See also 
Royal National Theatre

References

Bibliography
Howard Brenton, The Romans in Britain (London: Eyre Methuen, 1980)

External links 
Look Back in Anger The Guardian, January 2006, feature article.
Review round-up about the 2006 Sheffield production
 From the archive, 19 March 1982: The Romans in Britain obscenity trial dropped From The Guardian

British plays
1980 plays
1982 in the United Kingdom
Rape in fiction